Saiva gemmata is the type species of the genus Saiva, which are lantern bugs found from the North-East of India to Indo-China (Thailand and Vietnam). No subspecies are listed in the Catalogue of Life.

References

External links
 
 

Fulgorinae